The Western Conference is one of two conferences in the Kontinental Hockey League (KHL) used to divide teams. Its counterpart is the Eastern Conference.

Divisions

Western Conference Cup winners

Notes
1. 2020 Gagarin Cup playoffs were cancelled due to the COVID-19 pandemic

References

See also
Kontinental Hockey League team changes

 
Kontinental Hockey League divisions